Marcola is an unincorporated community in Lane County, Oregon, United States, northeast of Springfield on the Mohawk River.

Demographics

History
The post office at this location was established in 1876 and originally called "Isabel" for early settler Isabel Applegate. About 1900, a railroad was built through the Mohawk Valley and a station named Marcola was established near the post office. Marcola was a name made up to honor Mary Cole, the wife of the town's founder, Columbus Cole. In 1901, the post office name was changed to agree with the name of the station.

In 1900 there was a community of Japanese people in Marcola who had come to help construct the Southern Pacific railroad line that was built into the Mohawk Valley to help the local lumber mills ship their timber.

The 1938 National Register of Historic Places-listed Earnest Bridge, a covered bridge in the Marcola area, was featured in the 1965 James Stewart film Shenandoah.

Notable people
Courtney Love (born 1964), musician and actress, lived with her family at a commune in Marcola

See also
Mohawk High School (Marcola, Oregon)

References

External links

Marcola School District
Images of the historic covered bridges in the Marcola area from Salem Public Library

Unincorporated communities in Lane County, Oregon
1876 establishments in Oregon
Populated places established in 1876
Unincorporated communities in Oregon